DD Yadagiri is a state-owned Telugu language television channel operated by India's national broadcaster Doordarshan. It is one of the 11 Indian language channels operated by Doordarshan and is telecast from Doordarshan Kendra, Hyderabad and caters the state of Telangana. The channel is named for Lord Narasimha of Yadagirigutta in the state.

History of Kendra
Hyderabad's Doordarshan Kendra has transformed from the initial setup of Television Base Production Center during 1974. It was inaugurated by the then President of India, N. Sanjeeva Reddy on 23 October 1977. The service has been extended to the entire state in phased manner by installing Terrestrial Transmitters of different capacities (HPTs, LPTs, VLPTs) in different parts of the state. Hyderabad programmes were beamed through satellite and Cable Networks. Doordarshan Kendra Hyderabad's Regional Network in Telugu took on a new identity of DD Saptagiri, on 2 April 2003.

After bifurcation of Andhra Pradesh state, the DD Saptagiri was relegated to being telecast from Doordarshan Kendra Vijayawada for Andhra Pradesh while the existing network, named DD Yadagiri, was aimed at the Telangana populace. DD Yadagiri's operations have been continued from its current Ramanthapur office, Hyderabad. The channel highlights the Telangana culture, and dialect.

Frequency & satellite details
INSAT-3A (C-BAND) 93.5E 3840 MHz VERTICAL 4250, INSAT-4B (KU) 93.5E 11150 V 27500

See also 
 All India Radio 
 DD Direct Plus 
 List of programs broadcast by DD National 
 List of South Asian television channels by country
 Prasar Bharati

References

External links 
 Doordarshan Official Internet site 
 Doordarshan news site 
 An article at PFC

Doordarshan
Television stations in Hyderabad
Telugu-language television channels
Foreign television channels broadcasting in the United Kingdom
Television channels and stations established in 1977
Direct broadcast satellite services
Indian direct broadcast satellite services